Nenad Vukčević (born 25 November 1974) is a Montenegrin former football player and current manager who played as a forward for clubs in FR Yugoslavia, Greece and Sweden. He was recently served as a manager of FK Podgorica.

Playing career
Born in Titograd, SR Montenegro, Vukčević began his career playing for local side FK Budućnost Podgorica. He would also play for FK Spartak Subotica, before joining Greek Superleague side Panachaiki F.C. in 1999.

He spent four seasons in the Greek top flight with Panachaiki, making 100 league appearances for the club.

Managerial career
Late in his playing career, Vukčević was a player-coach for FK Kom. Later, he joined the staff of FK Budućnost Podgorica, and became the club's caretaker co-manager in 2010.

After several year in the staff of FK Budućnost Podgorica, he was appointed as the manager of the club in July 2013 following the departure of Radislav Dragicevic. He left the club in March 2014. 

In June 2016, he became the manager of FK Kom which lasted until March 2017. On 10 January 2019, he was appointed as the manager of FK Rudar Pljevlja.

On 25 September 2019, Vukčević was appointed manager of Petrovac.

References

External links

1974 births
Living people
Footballers from Podgorica
Association football forwards
Serbia and Montenegro footballers
Montenegrin footballers
FK Budućnost Podgorica players
FK Spartak Subotica players
Panachaiki F.C. players
Vyzas F.C. players
Chalkida F.C. players
Ljungskile SK players
FK Kom players
First League of Serbia and Montenegro players
Super League Greece players
Superettan players
Montenegrin First League players
Serbia and Montenegro expatriate footballers
Expatriate footballers in Greece
Serbia and Montenegro expatriate sportspeople in Greece
Expatriate footballers in Sweden
Serbia and Montenegro expatriate sportspeople in Sweden
Montenegrin football managers
FK Budućnost Podgorica managers
FK Rudar Pljevlja managers
FK Kom managers
OFK Petrovac managers